Micropanchax is a genus of poeciliids native to Africa.

Species
The 13 recognized species in this genus are:

 Micropanchax antinorii (Vinciguerra, 1883) (black lampeye)
 Micropanchax bracheti (Berkenkamp, 1983)
 Micropanchax camerunensis (Radda, 1971) (Cameroon lampeye)
 Micropanchax ehrichi (Berkenkamp & Etzel, 1994)
 Micropanchax fuelleborni (Ahl, 1924) (Lake Rukwa lampeye)
 Micropanchax hutereaui (Boulenger, 1913) (mesh-scaled topminnow)
 Micropanchax johnstoni (Günther, 1894) (Johnston's topminnow)
 Micropanchax keilhacki (C. G. E. Ahl, 1928)
 Micropanchax kingii (Boulenger, 1913)
 Micropanchax loati (Boulenger, 1901) (Nile killifish)
 Micropanchax pfaffi (Daget, 1954) (Pfaff's lampeye)
 Micropanchax rudolfianus (Worthington, 1932) (Lake Rudolf lampeye)
 Micropanchax scheeli (Román, 1971) (Scheel's lampeye)

Laciris pelagicus (Worthington, 1932), formerly placed here, is now in Laciris.

References

 
Poeciliidae
Fish of Africa
Freshwater fish genera
Taxa named by George S. Myers
Ray-finned fish genera